Henneberg may refer to:

Places

County of Henneberg, a mediaeval state in the Holy Roman Empire
Henneberg, Thuringia, a municipality in Thuringia, Germany

People

Henneberg family, a German noble family
 Catherine of Henneberg (c. 1334–1397)
 Berthold von Henneberg (1442–1504), Archbishop of Mainz
 William IV, Princely count of Henneberg-Schleusingen (c. 1475–1559)
Claus H. Henneberg (1936-1998), German librettist and translator
Georg Henneberg (1908-1996), German physician, director of Robert Koch Institute
Gerd Michael Henneberg  (1922-2011), German actor and theater director
Jill Henneberg (1974-), US Olympic equestrian
Johann Baptist Henneberg (1768-1822), Austrian composer, pianist, organist and Kapellmeister
Maciej Henneberg (born 1949), Australian-Polish physical anthropologist and evolutionist
Mary Jane (Molly) Henneberg (born 1973), TV reporter
Nathalie Henneberg (1910-1977), French science fiction writer
Richard Henneberg (1853-1925), German composer
Wilhelm Henneberg (1825-1890), German chemist, disciple of Liebig.
Zdzisław Henneberg (1911-1941), Polish pilot, Squadron Leader in the Battle of Britain

See also
 Henneberger (disambiguation)
 Hennenberg
 Hennenberger